Jack Kane was an Australian politician.

Jack Kane may also refer to:

 Jack Kane (composer), Canadian musician
 Jack Kane (ice hockey), Canadian sportsman
 Jack Kane (Lord Provost), Scottish politician and social campaigner